Alt Bennebek is a municipality in Schleswig-Flensburg district, in Schleswig-Holstein, northern Germany.

Old Bennebek located about 30 km north-west of Rendsburg in the Sorgeniederung on the border between Geest and Marsch. About 15 km to the west, the highway 77 runs and 30 km west, the Federal Highway 7 of Rendsburg to Schleswig.

External links

 Community Alt Bennebek

References

Municipalities in Schleswig-Holstein
Schleswig-Flensburg